Karol Beck was the defending champion, but lost to Jürgen Zopp already in the first round.
Andreas Seppi won the title, defeating Gilles Müller 3–6, 6–3, 6–4 in the final.

Seeds

Draw

Finals

Top half

Bottom half

References
 Main Draw
 Qualifying Draw

Internazionali Trismoka
2011 Singles